This is an episode list for the science fiction teen drama television series Kyle XY. The series premiered in the United States on June 26, 2006 and ended on March 16, 2009 on ABC Family with 43 episodes produced.

Series overview

Episodes

Season 1 (2006)

Season 2 (2007–08)

Season 3 (2009)

References

External links
 

Lists of American science fiction television series episodes
Lists of American teen drama television series episodes